This is a list of the individuals who were, at any given time, considered the next in line to succeed the British monarch to inherit the throne of the Kingdom of Great Britain (1707–1800), the United Kingdom of Great Britain and Ireland (1801–1922), or the United Kingdom of Great Britain and Northern Ireland (1922–present), should the incumbent monarch die or abdicate.

The list commences in 1707 following the Acts of Union, which joined the Kingdoms of England and Scotland (previously separate states, with separate legislatures but with the same monarch) into a single Kingdom of Great Britain. Anne became Queen of England, Scotland and Ireland on 8 March 1702 and Queen of Great Britain from 1707. The 1701 Act of Settlement established Electress Sophia of Hanover as successor to the English throne, and this was extended to Scotland through the Treaty of Union (Article II) and the Acts of Union.

List of heirs

Notes

See also
 Succession to the British throne
 List of heirs to the English throne
 List of heirs to the Scottish throne
 Family tree of the British royal family

References 

 
Succession to the British crown
British
British monarchy-related lists